Bailey School, also known as New Bailey School, is a historic school building located at Springfield, Greene County, Missouri. It was designed by architect William B. Ittner and built in 1931.  It is a two-story, red brick building on a concrete foundation with simple Jacobethan Revival style design elements. A long, low one-story warehouse addition on the back wall was added in 1966.

It was listed on the National Register of Historic Places in 2016.

References

School buildings on the National Register of Historic Places in Missouri
Tudor Revival architecture in Missouri
School buildings completed in 1931
Buildings and structures in Springfield, Missouri
National Register of Historic Places in Greene County, Missouri